San Javier Municipality is a municipality in Sonora in north-western Mexico. As of 2015, the municipality had a total population of 557.

The area of the municipality is 793.27 km2. and the population was 557 in 2015.  Surrounding municipalities are Soyopa to the north, Onavas, to the east, Suaqui Grande, to the south, and Colorada, to the west.

References

Municipalities of Sonora